The 2005 Cleveland mayoral election took place on November 8, 2005, to elect the Mayor of Cleveland, Ohio. The election was officially nonpartisan, with the top two candidates from the October 4 primary advancing to the general election, regardless of party.

Incumbent Democratic Mayor Jane L. Campbell ran for re-election to a second term in office, but lost the general election to Cleveland City Council President Frank G. Jackson.

Candidates
 Anthony B. Brown (Democrat)
 Jane L. Campbell, incumbent Mayor of Cleveland (Democrat)
 James A. Draper, former Cleveland Public Safety Director (Democrat)
 Frank G. Jackson, Cleveland City Council President (Democrat)
 David M. Lynch, former mayor of Euclid, Ohio (Republican)
 Michael L. Nelson, lawyer (Democrat)
 Bill Patmon, former Cleveland City Councilman (Democrat)
 Robert J. Triozzi, former Cleveland Municipal Court judge (Democrat)

Primary election

General election

Polling

Results

Notes

References

2000s in Cleveland
Cleveland mayoral
Cleveland
Mayoral elections in Cleveland
Non-partisan elections